Behind the Mask: The Story of the People Who Risk Everything to Save Animals is a 2006 documentary film about the Animal Liberation Front (ALF). It took three years of filming, interviewing, and editing to complete. The movie was created by animal rights lawyer Shannon Keith, who owns Uncaged Films and ARME (Animal Rescue, Media & Education).

About 
The film is about animal rights activists who break into laboratories and other facilities to obtain footage of the way animals are used. It includes well-known names within the animal rights movement, some of whom have been imprisoned for taking direct action. According to the film's producer Shannon Keith, a lawyer, "change only happens in society when laws are broken", and according to arsonist Melanie Arnold who set ablaze a slaughterhouse, "If I had an opportunity, I would do it again since economic damage to animal abusers is justifiable."

See also
Animal liberation movement

References

External links
 

2006 documentary films
American independent films
Animal Liberation Front
Anti-modernist films
Documentary films about animal rights
Documentary films about animal testing
Documentary films about politics
Documentary films about terrorism
Films about activists
2000s English-language films
2000s American films